Songs For Groovy Children: The Fillmore East Concerts is a chronologically sequenced collection of American musician Jimi Hendrix's 1969–1970 New Years recorded performances at the Fillmore East in New York City. It was released as a box set of five-CDs on November 22, 2019 and an eight-LP set on December 13.

With over five hours of recorded music, the box set contains 43 songs, which Experience Hendrix (the current managers of Hendrix's recording legacy) note "assembles all four concerts from New Year’s Eve 1969 and New Year’s Day 1970".  Several previously unreleased recordings are included, along with longer versions of some already issued.  However, at least five songs were left off and at least one other was edited for the box set.

Background and recording
Not long after his performance at the Woodstock Festival on August 18, 1969, Hendrix began rehearsing and recording with drummer Buddy Miles and bassist Billy Cox. As part of deal to settle a contract dispute, Hendrix agreed to deliver an album to Capitol Records.  To meet this, four sets of performances over two nights at the Fillmore East auditorium in New York City were recorded by the trio. Sound engineer Wally Heider, who had recorded Hendrix live several times, including at the Monterey Pop Festival in 1967 and Woodstock, supervised the recording.

Songs
Since Hendrix was obligated to supply an album of new material, the set lists for the Fillmore East shows contained mostly new songs.  Although songs, such as "Lover Man", "Hear My Train A Comin'", and "Bleeding Heart" had often been played by the Jimi Hendrix Experience, they had not been issued on record.  At Woodstock, Hendrix performed early versions of "Message to Love", "Izabella", and part of "Stepping Stone", which were not released officially until the 1990s (although studio versions of the last two were released as a single in the U.S. in April 1970). 

In addition to these tunes, several new Hendrix compositions were debuted and recorded: "Power of Soul", "Machine Gun", "Ezy Ryder", "Earth Blues", "Burning Desire", and "Who Knows". Miles also supplied a couple of originals: "Changes" and the jam number "We Gotta Live Together". The set lists included the Jerry Ragovoy and Mort Shuman composition "Stop" (a hit in 1968 for R&B singer Howard Tate) sung by Miles. The popular Experience numbers, "Stone Free", "Foxey Lady", "Voodoo Child (Slight Return)", and "Purple Haze" were sometimes played for encores.

Experience Hendrix indicates that Songs For Groovy Children "boasts over two dozen tracks that have either never before been released commercially or have been newly pressed and newly remixed".  Tracks not previously officially released in one form or another, include "Ezy Ryder", "Changes", "Message to Love", and "Stop" from the December 31 second show; and "Lover Man", "Steal Away", "Hey Joe", and "Purple Haze" from the January 1 second show.  Additionally, longer versions of previously released tracks include "Who Knows" and "Stone Free" from December 31, 1969 second show; "Who Knows" and "Stop" from January 1, 1970 first show; and "Power of Soul", "Changes", "Machine Gun", and "We Gotta Live Together" from January 1, 1970 second show. However, AllMusic critic Sean Westergaard notes that "We Gotta Live Together" lasts "just under ten minutes", while the full performance lasted 18 minutes.

Set lists and releases

Critical reception

In a review for AllMusic, Sean Westergaard gave Songs for Groovy Children four out of five stars. He notes the high quality sound and more comprehensive presentation of the four shows: "this is an amazing set. The band is completely locked into each other and Hendrix turns in some truly astonishing playing. Hearing all four shows gives a better idea of how improvised some of these performances were, yet how in tune the players were with each other."  However, he feels that inclusion of longer versions of songs originally edited for the 1970 Band of Gypsys album "doesn't necessarily make for better listening" and that "the five complete tracks left off the second December 31 set... should have been included."

Track listing

Personnel
Musicians
Billy Coxbass, vocals
Jimi Hendrixguitar, vocals, original recordings producer (as Heaven Research)
Buddy Milesdrums, vocals

Production personnel
Bernie Grundmanmastering engineer
Chandler Harrodstudio mixing engineer
Wally Heiderlive recording engineer
Janie Hendrixproducer
Eddie Kramermixing engineer, producer
John McDermottproducer

Charts

Footnotes

References

Bibliography

Jimi Hendrix live albums
2019 live albums
Live at the Fillmore East albums